Airlie Runnalls (born 25 June 1998) is an Australian rules footballer playing for the Fremantle Football Club in the AFL Women's (AFLW). Runnalls was drafted by Fremantle with their fourth selection, and 44th overall in the 2021 AFL Women's draft.  

Originally from Yarrawonga on the Victoria-NSW border, Runnalls was recruited from North Melbourne as Fremantle's first ever draft selection from outside of Western Australia. She made her debut in the opening round of the 2022 AFLW season.

References

External links 

1998 births
Living people
Fremantle Football Club (AFLW) players
Australian rules footballers from Victoria (Australia)